Kidara I (Late Brahmi script:  Ki-da-ra) fl. 350-390 CE) was the first major ruler of the Kidarite Kingdom, which replaced the Indo-Sasanians in northwestern India, in the areas of Kushanshahr, Gandhara, Kashmir and Punjab.

Reign
Kidara himself was a nomadic ruler who invaded the areas of Tukharistan and Gandhara hitherto ruled by the Indo-Sasanians. It is thought the Kidarites had initially invaded Sogdiana and Bactria from the north circa 300 CE. His people may have been pushed out from the northern areas of Bactria by migrating Hephthalites.

Kidara's ethnicity is unclear, but he may himself have been a Chionite, and he belongs to the general category of the Huns or Huna. Already during the 4th century Sasanian Emperor Shapur II had fought against Chionite invaders led by king Grumbates, and ultimately passed an alliance with them, using their military in the campaign against the Romans in the siege of the fortress of Amida (now Diyarbakır, Turkey). Chinese sources explain however that the Kidarites are the Lesser Yuezhi, which would make them relatives of the Yuezhi, themselves ancestors of the Kushans.

Kidara having established himself in Tukharistan and Gandara, took the title of Kushanshah which until that time had been used by the rulers of the Indo-Sasanian kingdom. He thus founded the eponymous new dynasty of the Kidarites in northwestern India. The Kidarites also claimed to have been successors of the Kushans, possibly due to their ethnic proximity.

Coinage
Kidara struck both Sasanian-style gold and silver coins (imitating his immediate predecessor in the region Varahran I) and Kushan-style gold coins, before issuing coins in his own name.

See also
 Kushano-Sassanians
 Sasanian coinage of Sindh

References

4th-century monarchs in Asia
Kushanshahs